Benson Walker Hough (March 5, 1875 – November 19, 1935) was a United States district judge of the United States District Court for the Southern District of Ohio.

Education and career

Born in Berkshire Township, Delaware County, Ohio, Hough received a Master of Arts degree from Ohio Wesleyan University in 1897 and a Bachelor of Laws from the Ohio State University Moritz College of Law in 1899. He entered private practice in Delaware, Ohio from 1900 to 1916. He was the Adjutant General of Ohio from 1915 to 1916, serving in the United States Army during World War I from 1917 to 1919. He voluntarily requested a demotion from General to Colonel in order to accompany the 4th Ohio Infantry, renamed the 166th US Infantry, and incorporated into the 42nd Infantry Division, to France. Hough was elected as a justice of the Supreme Court of Ohio, serving from 1920 to 1923. He was the United States Attorney for the Southern District of Ohio from 1923 to 1925.

Federal judicial service

Hough was nominated by President Calvin Coolidge on January 31, 1925, to a seat on the United States District Court for the Southern District of Ohio vacated by Judge John Elbert Sater. He was confirmed by the United States Senate on February 9, 1925, and received his commission the same day. His service terminated on November 19, 1935, due to his death at a hospital in Columbus, Ohio. He was interred in Berkshire Township.

Personal

Hough was married to Edith Markel on June 25, 1902, and had one child.

References

Sources
 

1875 births
1935 deaths
Justices of the Ohio Supreme Court
United States Attorneys for the Southern District of Ohio
Judges of the United States District Court for the Southern District of Ohio
United States district court judges appointed by Calvin Coolidge
20th-century American judges
United States Army personnel of World War I
Ohio Wesleyan University alumni
Ohio State University Moritz College of Law alumni
Lawyers from Columbus, Ohio
People from Delaware County, Ohio
United States Army colonels